East Haldon is a rural locality in the Lockyer Valley Region, Queensland, Australia.

References 

Lockyer Valley Region
Localities in Queensland